The Diriyah Arena is an outdoor arena in Diriyah, Saudi Arabia. It has a capacity of 15,000.

History

Events
Andy Ruiz Jr. vs Anthony Joshua II was held at the venue on December 7, 2019.

Jake Paul vs Tommy Fury was held at the venue on February 26, 2023.

See also
Diriyah
Sport in Saudi Arabia

References

Sports venues in Saudi Arabia